Khalifeh Gari (also Romanized as Khalīfeh Garī; also known as Khalfehgarī and Khalīfeh Karī) is a village in Tula Rud Rural District, in the Central District of Talesh County, Gilan Province, Iran. At the 2006 census, its population was 493, in 113 families.

References 

Populated places in Talesh County